Baffour Gyan (born 2 July 1980) is a Ghanaian former professional footballer who played as a striker.

Club career
Gyan was born in Accra. He played for Dynamo Moscow, FC Saturn and Czech side Slovan Liberec. After twelve years playing of playing football in Europe, he returned on 28 September 2009 back to his homeland Ghana and signed a three years contract with Asante Kotoko.

International career
Gyan was a regular for Ghana and was part of the squad at the 2004 Summer Olympics. On 18 November 2007, he scored for Ghana in their 2–0 win against Togo in the Pre-2008 African Cup of Nations Tournament held in Accra, Ghana. He made 25 appearances for Ghana scoring 4 goals.

Personal life
He is the brother of Asamoah Gyan and attended the Adisadel College in Cape Coast Ghana.

In September 2014, Baffour Gyan handed himself over to the police when the Ashanti Regional Editor of the Daily Graphic, Daniel Kenu, accused him of having led some people to assault him: during a pre-match press conference for the black stars 2015 African Cup qualifier against Uganda, Kenu had asked Asamoah Gyan to clarify a rumour that he had a hand in the disappearance of his friend, Theophilus Tagoe alias 'Castro', a musician. Kenu said much later on, Baffour Gyan who had not been at the press conference, met him and assaulted him.
Baffour denied the accusation. Though the case went to court, Kenu withdrew the case citing health reasons.

References

External links

1980 births
Living people
Association football forwards
Ghanaian footballers
Ghana international footballers
Ghana under-20 international footballers
Olympic footballers of Ghana
Footballers at the 2004 Summer Olympics
2002 African Cup of Nations players
2008 Africa Cup of Nations players
Asante Kotoko S.C. players
Super League Greece players
Kalamata F.C. players
Anagennisi Karditsa F.C. players
Czech First League players
FC Slovan Liberec players
FC Dynamo Moscow players
Expatriate footballers in Greece
FC Saturn Ramenskoye players
Expatriate footballers in the Czech Republic
Russian Premier League players
Footballers from Accra
Expatriate footballers in Kazakhstan
Ghanaian expatriate footballers
Liberty Professionals F.C. players
Ghanaian expatriate sportspeople in the Czech Republic
Expatriate footballers in Russia
FC Astana players
Ghanaian expatriate sportspeople in Kazakhstan
Ghanaian expatriate sportspeople in Russia